Parakev Arsenov is a Bulgarian wheelchair curler.

Teams

References

External links 

Living people
Bulgarian male curlers
Bulgarian wheelchair curlers
Year of birth missing (living people)